Peace of Mind (German: Reserve hat Ruh) is a 1931 German comedy film directed by Max Obal and starring Fritz Kampers, Lucie Englisch, and Paul Hörbiger. It was shot on location around Berlin. The film's sets were designed by the art director Jacek Rotmil. It is one of a number of farces set during the pre-First World War Germany military which were made in the early 1930s.

Cast
 Fritz Kampers as Paule Zapp  
 Lucie Englisch as Aenne Schulz 
 Paul Hörbiger as Dr. Egon Breitner  
 Senta Söneland as Frau Dienstag, Wirtin  
 Hugo Fischer-Köppe as Feldwebel  
 Albert Paulig as Hauptmann Sauer  
 Claire Rommer as Lotte Fiedler - Studentin  
 Adolf E. Licho as Lotte Fiedlers Vater  
 Lotte Steinhoff as Eva - Lotte Fiedlers Freundin  
 Gerhard Bienert as Unteroffizier Krause  
 Heinrich Fuchs as Meyrink  
 John Mylong as Arthur Dreyer, Student 
 Arthur Reppert as Rekrut

References

Bibliography 
 Grange, William. Cultural Chronicle of the Weimar Republic. Scarecrow Press, 2008.

External links 
 

1931 films
Films of the Weimar Republic
1930s German-language films
Films directed by Max Obal
Films set in the 1900s
Military humor in film
German historical comedy films
1930s historical comedy films
German black-and-white films
1931 comedy films
1930s German films